The Women's giant slalom competition of the Lillehammer 1994 Olympics was held at Hafjell on Thursday, February 24.

The defending world champion was Carole Merle of France, as well as the defending World Cup giant slalom champion, while Austria's Anita Wachter led the current season.

Italy's Deborah Compagnoni won the gold medal, Martina Ertl of Germany took the silver, and the bronze medalist was Vreni Schneider of Switzerland. Compagnoni led after the first run, followed by Hilde Gerg of Germany and Wachter; Gerg failed to finish, Wachter was fourth, and Merle was fifth.

Compagnoni dedicated the win to her late friend Ulrike Maier of Austria, who died after a crash in a downhill event in late January.

Results

References 

Women's giant slalom
Alp
Olymp